Lauren Danielle Drain (born December 31, 1985) is a former member of the Westboro Baptist Church who wrote the 2013 book Banished, which chronicles her experiences and eventual banishment from the church.

Early life
Drain was born in Tampa, Florida and lived in nearby Bradenton until age five, when she moved to Olathe, Kansas, with her father, Steve, who enrolled in a graduate program at the University of Kansas.<ref>Banished, first page in chapter 1 and another page: "Mom and Dad found us a house to rent in Bradenton"</ref>

Steve Drain first came into contact with Westboro while working on a documentary critical of the church. He eventually became a fervent convert, and his entire family followed him into the church. Lauren Drain was a member from 2001 until 2007, when she was excommunicated for questioning church doctrine and unauthorized contact with a Connecticut man seeking to learn more about the church. Following her excommunication, she briefly lived on her own in Topeka, but was haunted by reminders of her banishment from the church and her family, eventually deciding to move to Connecticut. Her parents, two sisters, and brother remained members of the church and cut all ties with her. However, sometime in 2020, her parents and two younger siblings were also excommunicated for unknown reasons. It is unclear whether they have re-established contact.

Drain graduated from Topeka West High School in Topeka, Kansas and earned a Wiseman Scholarship to Washburn University.

Career
Drain graduated from Washburn University in 2007 with a Bachelor of Science degree in nursing. She worked as a Registered nurse for nine years before becoming a full-time personal trainer and fitness model.

Drain participated in the NOH8 Campaign in 2013.

Drain wrote the book titled Banished: Surviving My Years in the Westboro Baptist Church'', co-authored by Lisa Pulitzer which describes her experiences in the Westboro Baptist Church and her ultimate expulsion from the church. It has been on the New York Best Sellers list in the eBook category as of March 30, 2013.

Drain is a fitness model, using her social media account such as Instagram and Facebook to showcase her fitness routines, strength and motivational content.

Personal life
Drain has been married to David Kagan since August 2013. As of 2013 she lives in Connecticut. She identifies as a Christian. In 2019, Drain and her husband announced that they were expecting a baby, and Drain gave birth to a child later that year.

See also
 Megan Phelps-Roper
 Nathan Phelps

References

External links 

 

1985 births
21st-century American women writers
American Christian writers
American exercise and fitness writers
American exercise instructors
21st-century American memoirists
American nurses
American women nurses
Female models from Connecticut
Female models from Florida
Female models from Kansas
Fitness and figure competitors
Former members of the Westboro Baptist Church
American LGBT rights activists
Living people
People from Olathe, Kansas
Washburn University alumni
American women memoirists
Writers from Kansas
Writers from New Britain, Connecticut
Writers from Tampa, Florida